Below is the list of populated places in Niğde Province, Turkey by district. In the following lists first place in each list is the administrative center of the district.

Niğde 

       Niğde
	Aktaş, Niğde
	Ağcaşar, Niğde
	Alay, Niğde
	Aşlama, Niğde
	Bağlama, Niğde
	Ballı, Niğde
	Çarıklı, Niğde
	Çavdarlı, Niğde
	Çayırlı, Niğde
	Değirmenli, Niğde
	Dikilitaş, Niğde
	Dündarlı, Niğde
	Edikli, Niğde
	Elmalı, Niğde
	Fertek, Niğde
	Fesleğen, Niğde
	Gösterli, Niğde
	Gülüce, Niğde
	Gümüşler, Niğde
	Hacıabdullah, Niğde
	Hacıbeyli, Niğde
	Hamamlı, Niğde
	Hançerli, Niğde
	Hasaköy, Niğde
	Himmetli, Niğde
	İçmeli, Niğde
	Karaatlı, Niğde
	Kayırlı, Niğde
	Kırkpınar, Niğde
	Kızılören, Niğde
	Kiledere, Niğde
	Konaklı, Niğde
	Koyunlu, Niğde
	Kömürcü, Niğde
	Kumluca, Niğde
	Küçükköy, Niğde
	Narköy, Niğde
	Orhanlı, Niğde
	Ovacık, Niğde
	Özyurt, Niğde
	Pınarcık, Niğde
	Sazlıca, Niğde
	Taşlıca, Niğde
	Tepeköy, Niğde
	Tırhan, Niğde
	Uluağaç, Niğde
	Yarhisar, Niğde
	Yaylayolu, Niğde
	Yeşilburç, Niğde
	Yeşilgölcük, Niğde
	Yeşilova, Niğde
	Yıldıztepe, Niğde

Altunhisar 

       Altunhisar
	Akçaören, Altunhisar
	Çömlekçi, Altunhisar
	Karakapı, Altunhisar
	Keçikalesi, Altunhisar
	Ulukışla, Altunhisar
	Uluören, Altunhisar
	Yakacık, Altunhisar
	Yeşilyurt, Altunhisar

Bor 

       Bor
	Badak, Bor
	Bahçeli, Bor
	Balcı, Bor
	Bayat, Bor
	Bereke, Bor
	Çukurkuyu, Bor
	Emen, Bor
	Gökbez, Bor
	Halaç, Bor
	Havuzlu, Bor
	Karacaören, Bor
	Karamahmutlu, Bor
	Karanlıkdere, Bor
	Kavuklu, Bor
	Kayı, Bor
	Kaynarca, Bor
	Kemerhisar, Bor
	Kılavuz, Bor
	Kızılca, Bor
	Kızılkapı, Bor
	Kürkçü, Bor
	Obruk, Bor
	Okçu, Bor
	Postallı, Bor
	Seslikaya, Bor
	Tepeköy, Bor

Çamardı 

       Çamardı
	Bademdere, Çamardı
	Bekçili, Çamardı
	Beyazkışlakçı, Çamardı
	Burç, Çamardı
	Celaller, Çamardı
	Çardacık, Çamardı
	Çukurbağ, Çamardı
	Demirkazık, Çamardı
	Elekgölü, Çamardı
	Eynelli, Çamardı
	Kavaklıgöl, Çamardı
	Kavlaktepe, Çamardı
	Kocapınar, Çamardı
	Mahmatlı, Çamardı
	Orhaniye, Çamardı
	Ören, Çamardı
	Pınarbaşı, Çamardı
	Sulucaova, Çamardı
	Üçkapılı, Çamardı
	Yelatan, Çamardı
	Yeniköy, Çamardı

Çiftlik 

      Çiftlik
	Asmasız, Çiftlik
	Azatlı, Çiftlik
	Bozköy, Çiftlik
	Çardak, Çiftlik
	Çınarlı, Çiftlik
	Divarlı, Çiftlik
	Kitreli, Çiftlik
	Kula, Çiftlik
	Mahmutlu, Çiftlik
	Murtazaköy, Çiftlik
	Ovalıbağ, Çiftlik
	Sultanpınarı, Çiftlik
	Şeyhler, Çiftlik

Ulukışla 

       Ulukışla
	Alihoca, Ulukışla
	Altay, Ulukışla
	Ardıçlı, Ulukışla
	Başmakçı, Ulukışla
	Bayağıl, Ulukışla
	Çanakçı, Ulukışla
	Çiftehan, Ulukışla
	Çifteköy, Ulukışla
	Darboğaz, Ulukışla
	Elmalı, Ulukışla
	Eminlik, Ulukışla
	Emirler, Ulukışla
	Gedelli, Ulukışla
	Gümüşköy, Ulukışla
	Güney, Ulukışla
	Hacıbekirli, Ulukışla
	Handere, Ulukışla
	Hasangazi, Ulukışla
	Horoz, Ulukışla
	Hüsniye, Ulukışla
	İlhanköy, Ulukışla
	İmrahor, Ulukışla
	Karacaören, Ulukışla
	Kılan, Ulukışla
	Koçak, Ulukışla
	Kolsuz, Ulukışla
	Kozluca, Ulukışla
	Madenköy, Ulukışla
	Ovacık, Ulukışla
	Porsuk, Ulukışla
	Şeyhömerli, Ulukışla
	Tabaklı, Ulukışla
	Tekneçukur, Ulukışla
	Tepeköy, Ulukışla
	Toraman, Ulukışla
	Ünlüyaka, Ulukışla
	Yeniyıldız, Ulukışla

References

List
Nigde